Ilgenbach is a river of Baden-Württemberg, Germany. It flows into the Murg near Baiersbronn-Mitteltal.

See also
List of rivers of Baden-Württemberg

Rivers of Baden-Württemberg
Rivers of the Black Forest
Tributaries of the Murg (Northern Black Forest)
Rivers of Germany